Fraserdale is an unincorporated place and railroad point in Unorganized Cochrane, North Part in Cochrane District, Northern Ontario, Canada. The community/train stop was named for Alan Fraser, a railway engineer, and is counted as part of Unorganized Cochrane, North Part in Canadian census data.

The neighbouring community Abitibi Canyon ( east) on the Abitibi River was the most extensive community ever built by the Ontario Hydro Electric Power Commission. It was home to 1500 residents and was established to house employees of Abitibi Canyon Generating Station.

Fraserdale is connected to Smooth Rock Falls on Ontario Highway 11 to the south and to Abitibi Canyon to the northeast via Ontario Highway 634.

References

External links
Ontario Highway 11 Homepage - Fraserdale (and the Abitibi Colony)

Communities in Cochrane District
Ontario Northland Railway points